Ahmadabad District is a district (bakhsh) in Mashhad County, Razavi Khorasan province, Iran. At the 2006 census, its population was 51,267, in 13,424 families.  The district has one city: Malekabad. The district has two rural districts (Dehestan): Piveh Zhan Rural District and Sarjam Rural District.

References 

Districts of Razavi Khorasan Province
Mashhad County